Prostanthera centralis is a species of flowering plant in the family Lamiaceae and is endemic to an area near the border between the Northern Territory and Western Australia. It is an erect shrub with hairy branchlets, hairy egg-shaped to elliptical leaves and mauve to blue flowers.

Description
Flowering occurs from July to October.

Taxonomy
Prostanthera centralis was first formally described in 1988 by Barry Conn in the journal Nuytsia from specimens collected in the Dean Range, near the Kaltukatjara settlement.

Distribution and habitat
This mintbush grows on rocky scree slopes in the Central Ranges bioregion near the border between the Northern Territory and Western Australia.

Conservation status
Prostanthera centralis is classified as "Priority Three" by the Government of Western Australia Department of Parks and Wildlife meaning that it is poorly known and known from only a few locations but is not under imminent threat.

References

centralis
Flora of Western Australia
Flora of the Northern Territory
Lamiales of Australia
Taxa named by Barry John Conn
Plants described in 1988